Douglas Newton Everett (April 3, 1905 – September 14, 1996) was an American ice hockey player. He was a star for the Dartmouth College hockey team in 1922-26 and a member of Sigma Chi Fraternity. After graduating, Everett received professional offers from the Boston Bruins, New York Rangers and Toronto Maple Leafs of the National Hockey League but opted to pursue a career in the insurance business in Concord, New Hampshire instead while continuing to play amateur hockey.

Everett competed in the 1932 Winter Olympics as a member of the American ice hockey team, which won the silver medal. He played five matches and scored four goals.  He was inducted into the United States Hockey Hall of Fame in 1974.

He was born in Cambridge, Massachusetts, United States, and died in Concord, New Hampshire.

References

External links
 
 

1905 births
1996 deaths
American men's ice hockey left wingers
Ice hockey players from Massachusetts
Ice hockey players at the 1932 Winter Olympics
Medalists at the 1932 Winter Olympics
Olympic silver medalists for the United States in ice hockey
Sportspeople from Cambridge, Massachusetts
United States Hockey Hall of Fame inductees
Yale University alumni